August Oetker (January 6, 1862 – January 10, 1918) was a German-French inventor, food scientist and businessman. He is known as the creator of baking powder as a ready-to-use product, and also as the founder of the Dr. Oetker company.

Biography

Early life
Oetker was born on January 6, 1862, in Obernkirchen, Germany.

Career
In 1891, he bought the Aschoffsche pharmacy in Bielefeld and developed a baking agent, which was designed to ensure the success of the baking process. Prior to Oetker, a British chemist, Alfred Bird, had already invented baking powder, and American scientist Eben Norton Horsford had developed a ready-made 'double-acting' baking powder.

From 1890, he distributed his invention under the brand name Backin, thus laying the basis for the family-owned company, called Oetker-Gruppe. The company still uses the very same recipe to produce baking powder. On September 21, 1909, Oetker filed a patent for his Procedure for making long-lasting baking powder or ready-to-bake flour.

Due to successful marketing, his products sold quite well and soon the old pharmacy had turned into a successful company. In 1900, Oetker built his first manufacturing plant and, by 1906, had sold 50 million packages of Backin.

Death and legacy

Oetker died on January 10, 1918, in Bielefeld, Germany. Later, his grandson, Rudolf August Oetker, took over the company.

Motto:  ("A bright mind always uses Oetker.").

See also 
 Oetker Collection
 Alfred Bird, inventor of Bird's custard and also the first baking powder in 1843
 Henry Jones, a Bristol baker who patented self-raising flour in 1845, as a means of providing fresh bread on ships.

External links
 

1862 births
1918 deaths
People from Schaumburg
German company founders
19th-century German businesspeople
20th-century German businesspeople
German food scientists
German businesspeople in the food industry
Dr. Oetker people
19th-century German inventors